Filippo "Pippo" Pozzato (born 10 September 1981) is an Italian former road racing cyclist, who rode professionally between 2000 and 2018 for the , , , , , , and two spells with the / teams.

A northern classics specialist, Pozzato finished in second place at both the 2009 Paris–Roubaix and the 2012 Tour of Flanders. Pozzato finished a total of 37 Monument classics, including a victory in the 2006 Milan–San Remo; he finished second in the race in 2008 as well. Pozzato also won stages at the 2004 Tour de France, the 2007 Tour de France and the 2010 Giro d'Italia, and was the winner of the 2009 Italian National Road Race Championships.

Career

Mapei–Quick-Step
Born in Sandrigo, Veneto, Pozzato turned professional in 2000 with the  cycling team, part of the famous classe di '81 a group of emerging young riders born in 1981 who were part of the Mapei TT3 development team. Other alumni include Fabian Cancellara and Bernhard Eisel, Alexandr Kolobnev and Gryschenko.

Fassa Bortolo
After Mapei ended its sponsorship in 2002 Pozzato joined Giancarlo Ferretti's  cycling team. Despite his win of Tirreno–Adriatico in 2003 and a stage win in the 2004 Tour de France, personality clashes with Ferretti meant that Pozzato suffered poor years with Fassa Bortolo in 2002–2004. During this period he was injured for some time and had to work for star sprinter Alessandro Petacchi at other times.

During the 2004 season he was chosen to be part of the Italian 2004 Olympics team in support of team leader Paolo Bettini who went on to win the event.

Quick Step–Innergetic
The Quick Step-Innergetic team expressed interest and Pozzato was able to obtain a release for the 2005 ProTour season, joining several former Mapei riders already on the team, such as Paolo Bettini and Davide Bramati.

The 2005 ProTour season went better for Pozzato, with a win in the HEW Cyclassics in front of teammate Luca Paolini.

The 2006 season saw him win the first major classic of the year Milan–San Remo after a superb ride which saw him first work for team leader Tom Boonen, but then was forced to launch his own winning attack in the finale.

Liquigas
For the 2007 season, Pozzato joined the Liquigas squad, and began his season in style, winning the Tour du Haut Var, the Omloop Het Volk and Stage 5 of the Tour de France.

Team Katusha
In 2009 he won the E3 Prijs Vlaanderen. His results show experience, comfort, and power on the cobblestones and on the Belgian hills ("hellingen"). In aftermath of his 2nd place in the 2009 Paris–Roubaix, Pozzato claimed that when avoiding a crash of Thor Hushovd he lost 4 or 5 seconds and the chance for victory. He also suggested that Boonen benefited from the slipstream of official motorcycles to augment his lead.

In 2010 he has been accused by several riders, including Bjorn Leukemans, Boonen and Philippe Gilbert for his "negative tactics" during key races.  This resulted in the nickname "The Shadow".

Lampre-Merida
In 2013, Pozzato earned his first victory of the year in the Trofeo Laigueglia, held in Liguria, Italy on mainly narrow, twisting and turning roads. The sprint was contested by 4 riders, Pozzato getting the best of them. This marked Pozzato's third win in the event, a record in the race's history. In September, he raced the GP Ouest-France and despite not being a top favourite, he won the race, becoming just the fifth Italian to do that.

Southeast Pro Cycling
In 2016 Pozzato joined the Italian-based Southeast Pro Cycling Team. In December 2018 he announced his retirement from competition.

Doping ban
In 2012, Pozzato was banned from cycling for three months by the Italian National Olympic Committee (CONI) after it was found that he had worked with infamous doctor Michele Ferrari from 2005 to 2008. CONI had looked to ban him for a year but were forced to reduce it to a three months thanks to a technicality.

Major results

1998
 UCI Junior Road World Championships
2nd  Road race
3rd  Time trial
 2nd  Team pursuit, UCI Junior Track World Championships
1999
 3rd  Team pursuit, UCI Junior Track World Championships
 4th Road race, UCI Junior Road World Championships
2001
 9th Trofeo Luis Puig
 9th Paris–Bourges
2002
 1st  Overall Vuelta a Cuba
1st Stage 11a
 1st Duo Normand (with Evgeni Petrov)
 1st Giro del Lago Maggiore
 1st Tour du Lac Léman
 Tour de Normandie
1st Prologue, Stages 2, 3 & 5
 Tour of Slovenia
1st Stages 4 & 7
 Tour de l'Avenir
1st Stages 1 (ITT) & 5
 1st Prologue Ytong Bohemia Tour
 2nd Time trial, National Road Championships
 10th Chrono des Herbiers
2003
 1st  Overall Tirreno–Adriatico
1st Stage 2
 1st Trofeo Laigueglia
 1st Trofeo Matteotti
 1st Giro dell'Etna
 2nd Road race, National Road Championships
 2nd Giro della Provincia di Reggio Calabria
 6th Omloop Het Volk
2004
 1st Overall Giro della Liguria
 1st Trofeo Laigueglia
 1st Stage 7 Tour de France
 4th Gran Premio Bruno Beghelli
2005
 1st HEW Cyclassics
 1st Giro del Lazio
 1st Stage 2 Deutschland Tour
 2nd Road race, National Road Championships
 4th Overall Ster Elektrotoer
2006
 1st Milan–San Remo
 3rd Overall Tour of Britain
1st Stage 3
 3rd Vattenfall Cyclassics
 4th Gent–Wevelgem
 5th Omloop Het Volk
 6th GP Ouest–France
 10th Züri-Metzgete
 10th Paris–Tours
2007
 1st Omloop Het Volk
 1st Tour du Haut Var
 1st Trofeo Matteotti
 1st Gran Premio Industria e Commercio di Prato
 1st Stage 5 Tour de France
 1st Stage 6 Tour de Pologne
 3rd Trofeo Laigueglia
 4th GP Ouest–France
 5th Memorial Cimurri
 6th Gran Premio Città di Camaiore
2008
 1st  Overall Giro della Provincia di Grosseto
1st Stage 1
 1st Stage 1 (TTT) Vuelta a España
 2nd Milan–San Remo
 2nd Giro del Lazio
 2nd Coppa Sabatini
 3rd Road race, National Road Championships
 6th Tour of Flanders
 7th Overall Tirreno–Adriatico
 7th Trofeo Laigueglia
2009
 1st  Road race, National Road Championships
 1st E3 Prijs Vlaanderen
 1st Giro del Veneto
 1st Memorial Cimurri
 1st Stage 1 Three Days of De Panne
 2nd Paris–Roubaix
 2nd Trofeo Laigueglia
 4th Paris–Tours
 5th Tour of Flanders
 5th Clásica de San Sebastián
2010
 1st Stage 12 Giro d'Italia
 1st Stage 3 (TTT) Vuelta a Burgos
 3rd Giro del Piemonte
 4th Road race, UCI Road World Championships
 4th Montepaschi Strade Bianche
 4th E3 Prijs Vlaanderen
 5th Giro del Friuli
 7th Paris–Roubaix
 10th Omloop Het Nieuwsblad
2011
 1st Gran Premio Bruno Beghelli
 3rd Overall Tour de Picardie
 5th Milan–San Remo
2012
 1st GP Industria & Artigianato di Larciano
 2nd Tour of Flanders
 6th Milan–San Remo
 6th Dwars door Vlaanderen
 9th Gent–Wevelgem
2013
 1st Trofeo Laigueglia
 1st Coppa Ugo Agostoni
 1st GP Ouest–France
 2nd Roma Maxima
 3rd Gran Premio della Costa Etruschi
 5th Grand Prix Cycliste de Montréal
2014
 2nd Coppa Bernocchi
 3rd Tre Valli Varesine
2015
 10th Overall Dubai Tour
2016
 2nd Gran Premio Bruno Beghelli
 3rd Road race, National Road Championships
 4th Dwars door Vlaanderen
 5th Coppa Bernocchi
 7th Overall Giro di Toscana
 8th Milan–San Remo
 9th Gran Piemonte
2017
 8th GP Industria & Artigianato di Larciano
 8th Tour of Flanders

Grand Tour general classification results timeline

Monuments results timeline

References

External links

 
 
 Palmares on Cycling Base 
 Cyclingnews.com interview, September 2004
 

1981 births
Living people
Cyclists from the Province of Vicenza
Italian male cyclists
Italian Tour de France stage winners
Doping cases in cycling
Olympic cyclists of Italy
Cyclists at the 2004 Summer Olympics
Italian Giro d'Italia stage winners
Cyclists at the 2015 European Games
European Games competitors for Italy